Christian Christensen may refer to:

 Christian Christensen Kollerud (1767–1833), Norwegian politician
 Christian Christensen (runner) (1876–1956), Danish track and field athlete
 Christian Christensen (author) (1882–1960), Danish author and anarchist
 Christian Christensen (artist) (1898–1977), Norwegian artist
 Christian A. R. Christensen (1906–1967), Norwegian newspaper editor
 Christian Christensen (editor) (1922–1994), Norwegian newspaper editor
 Christian Christensen (boxer) (1926–2005), Danish middleweight boxer
 Christian Christensen (politician) (1925–1988), Danish politician, Minister for the Environment
 Christian Bommelund Christensen, Danish footballer

See also
 Niels Christian Christensen (1881–1945), Danish sport shooter
 Christen Christensen (disambiguation)
 Chris Christensen (born 1988), Norwegian swimmer
 Chris Christenson (1875–1943), Norwegian-American figure skater